Upaix is a commune in the Hautes-Alpes department in southeastern France.

Administration 
 2008–2014: Charles Aillaud
 2014–2020: Abel Jouve
 2020–2026: Florent Martin

Population

See also
Communes of the Hautes-Alpes department

References

Communes of Hautes-Alpes